Chris LeDoux was a rodeo cowboy who sang and recorded songs in his spare time and sold his albums from the back of his truck. With his father, he started his own record label, American Cowboy Songs, in 1970. Under that label he released 22 albums between 1971 and 1990. After gaining recognition from the 1989 Garth Brooks song, "Much Too Young (To Feel This Damn Old)" he was signed to Liberty Records, where he released 4 studio albums in four years. He released 6 more albums including a live album under Capitol Records. Horsepower in 2003 was his last studio album before his death in 2005. Nine official compilation albums have been released between 1994 and 2008. 20 Greatest Hits has been certified platinum by the RIAA.

LeDoux has released a total of 33 singles, most of them from his major label albums. While most of his singles failed to chart or missed the top 40, his most famous song is the duet with Garth Brooks, "Whatcha Gonna Do with a Cowboy" which charted at #7 on Billboards Hot Country Songs chart. The follow-up single, "Cadillac Ranch" reached #18.

Studio albums

1970s

1980s

1990s

2000s

Compilation albums

Live albums

Singles

1970s and 1980s

1990sNotes:A "Wild and Wooley" did not chart on Hot Country Songs, but peaked at No. 8 on Hot Country Radio Breakouts.

2000s

 Music videos 

Notes

A ^''' Western Underground'' also peaked at number 22 on the U.S. Top Heatseekers chart.

References

Country music discographies
 
Discographies of American artists